Christopher Ericson is a Dominica professional manager.

From February until March 2008, he was head coach of the Dominica national football team.

References

External links
Profile at Soccerway.com
Profile at Soccerpunter.com

Year of birth missing (living people)
Living people
Dominica football managers
Dominica national football team managers
Place of birth missing (living people)